Wicker Branch is a  long 3rd order tributary to Lanes Creek in Union County, North Carolina.

Course
Wicker Branch rises in a pond about 5 miles east-northeast of Alton, North Carolina.  Wicker Branch then flows southeast to meet Lanes Creek about 6 miles south of Allens Crossroads, North Carolina.

Watershed
Wicker Branch drains  of area, receives about 48.4 in/year of precipitation, has a topographic wetness index of 434.25 and is about 38% forested.

References

Rivers of North Carolina
Rivers of Union County, North Carolina
Tributaries of the Pee Dee River